This is a list of ships in the Republic of Singapore Navy.

Submarines

Challenger class submarine (Sjöormen-class)
RSS Conqueror
RSS Chieftain

Archer-class submarine (Västergötland-class)
RSS Archer
RSS Swordsman

Invincible-class submarine
 RSS Invincible (to be commissioned)
 RSS Impeccable (under construction)
 RSS Illustrious (under construction)
 RSS Inimitable (under construction)

Frigates

Formidable-class frigate (La Fayette-class)
RSS Formidable (68)
RSS Intrepid (69)
RSS Steadfast (70)
RSS Tenacious (71)
RSS Stalwart (72)
RSS Supreme (73)

Corvettes

Victory-class corvette
RSS Victory (P88)
RSS Valour (P89)
RSS Vigilance (P90)
RSS Valiant (P91)
RSS Vigour (P92)
RSS Vengeance (P93)

Patrol vessels

Independence-class littoral mission vessel
 RSS Independence (15)
 RSS Sovereignty (16)
 RSS Unity (17)
 RSS Justice (18)
 RSS Indomitable (19)
 RSS Fortitude (20) 
 RSS Dauntless (21) 
 RSS Fearless (22)

Sentinel-class maritime security response vessel
ex-Fearless-class patrol vessel.
 MSRV Sentinel (55)
 MSRV Guardian (56)
 MSRV Protector (57)
 MSRV Bastion (58)

Patrol boats

Combatant Craft Large (CCL)
26 meter stealth boat.

Specialised Marine Craft (SMC) Type II
25 meter stealth boat.

Fast Interceptor Craft 145

Mine warfare

Bedok-class mine countermeasures vessel (Landsort class)
RSS Bedok (M105)
RSS Kallang (M106)
RSS Katong (M107)
RSS Punggol (M108)

Amphibious warfare

Endurance-class landing platform dock ship
RSS Endurance (207) 
RSS Resolution  (208)
RSS Persistence (209)
RSS Endeavour (210)

Support ships
 MV Swift Rescue

Decommissioned ships

Challenger class submarine (Sjöormen-class)
 RSS Challenger
 RSS Centurion

Fearless-class patrol vessel
 RSS Resilience (82)
 RSS Unity (83)
 RSS Sovereignty (84)
 RSS Justice (85)
 RSS Freedom (86)
 RSS Independence (87)
 RSS Fearless (94)
 RSS Brave (95)
  (96)
 RSS Gallant (97)
 RSS Daring (98)
 RSS Dauntless (99)

Sea Wolf-class missile gunboat
 RSS Sea Wolf (P76)
 RSS Sea Lion (P77)
 RSS Sea Dragon (P78)
 RSS Sea Tiger (P79)
 RSS Sea Hawk (P80)
 RSS Sea Scorpion (P81)

Independence-class patrol craft
RSS Independence
RSS Freedom
RSS Justice
RSS Sovereignty
RSS Daring
RSS Dauntless

Swift-class coastal patrol craft
RSS Swift Knight (P11)
RSS Swift Lancer (P12)
RSS Swift Swordsman (P14)
RSS Swift Warrior (P15)
RSS Swift Archer (P16)
RSS Swift Warlord (P17)
RSS Swift Combatant (P18)
RSS Swift Challenger (P19)
RSS Swift Cavalier (P20)
RSS Swift Conqueror (P21)
RSS Swift Centurion (P22)
RSS Swift Chieftain (P23)

County-class landing ship tank
 RSS Endurance (L201)
 RSS Excellence (L202)
 RSS Intrepid (L203)
 RSS Resolution (L204)
 RSS Persistence (L205)

Sir Lancelot-class landing ship logistic

Bluebird-class minesweeper
RSS Jupiter (M101)
RSS Mercury (M102)

Singapore Naval Volunteer Force (Straits Settlement Royal Volunteer Naval Reserves)

 75' motor launch built in Singapore by Thornycroft in 1937 and sunk in 1942
 90' motorized fishing vessel built in England for RN c. 1944 and delivered 1948. Retired as wooden hull rotting out.
 117' built by United Engineering Limited of Singapore c. 1956; P68 retired in 1991.
 - Police patrol craft taken over by SNV in 1966

References

 Saunders, Stephen, Commodore, RN, Ed. Janes Fighting Ships, 107th Edition, 2004-2005. Alexandria, Virginia: Janes Information Group, 2004. .
 Saunders, Stephen, Commodore, RN, Ed. Janes Fighting Ships, 111th Edition, 2008-2009. Alexandria, Virginia: Janes Information Group, 2004. .

Ships of the Republic of Singapore Navy
Singapore